Acrocera melanderi is a species of small-headed flies in the family Acroceridae.

References

Acroceridae
Insects described in 1919
Diptera of North America